Douglas O'Connor (born 29 April 1954) is an English former professional footballer who played in the Football League for Barnsley, Mansfield Town and Scunthorpe United.

References

1954 births
Living people
English footballers
Association football forwards
English Football League players
Barnsley F.C. players
Mansfield Town F.C. players
Scunthorpe United F.C. players
Worsbrough Bridge Athletic F.C. players